Laughing City is the first EP of the band Eisley released after signing with Warner Bros. Records.  It was released May 20, 2003 on Record Collection Music.

Track listing
All songs written by Eisley.

Eisley albums
2003 EPs